Omas gegen Rechts (Grannies against the Right) is a  (initiative of citizens) in Germany and Austria. Founded in Vienna in 2017, in protest at extreme right-wing political positions, a German initiative was founded in 2018. Its members are mostly women in retirement or close to legal retirement age, concerned about developments in politics and social life that they regard as detrimental to a future for their grandchildren. Omas gegen Rechts were awarded the Paul Spiegel Prize for civil courage by the Central Council of Jews in Germany in 2020.

History 
The initiative Omas gegen Rechts was founded in Vienna in 2017 by journalist Susanne Scholl and Monika Salzer, a retired pastor. Salzer said that it was in response to the coalition of the Austrian People's Party and the Freedom Party of Austria during the first Kurz government. She wrote a book explaining why women who experienced life fight for the future of their grandchildren, Warum wir für die Zukunft unserer Enkel kämpfen.

Beginning in spring 2018, the Omas gegen Rechts is also active in Germany, as initiated by Anna Ohnweiler, a former teacher and social worker who grew up in socialist Romania. An association was founded and according to Deutsche Welle as of November 2020, it has 3000 members, a fifth of them male, and the movement is active in more than 70 towns. The Berliner Zeitung noted around 100 regional groups in Germany as of 2020.

Goals 

The initiative is active against antisemitism, racism and misogyny. It points at the danger of fascist tendencies, observed in Austria, Germany and other European countries. The initiative supports equal opportunity and tolerance and supports the Fridays for Future movement. Regional groups participate in actions against Protests over COVID-19 policies in Germany.

Awards 
In December 2019, Omas gegen Rechts received the Integrationspreis of Freiburg im Breisgau, and in November 2020 the Paul Spiegel Prize for Civic Courage (Paul-Spiegel-Preis für Zivilcourage) of the Central Council of Jews in Germany.

See also 

 Grandmothers of the Plaza de Mayo (Argentina)
 Granny Peace Brigade (United States and Canada)
 Mothers of the Plaza de Mayo (Argentina)
 Peace Mothers (Turkey)
 Raging Grannies (United States and Canada)

References

Further reading 
 Monika Salzer: Omas gegen Rechts – Warum wir für die Zukunft unserer Enkel kämpfen. Droemer HC, Munich, 2017, .

External links 

  Austria
  Initiative Germany
  Association Germany
Omas gegen rechts / Bündnis (in German)

2017 establishments in Austria
2017 protests
2018 establishments in Germany
2018 protests
Anti-racism in Austria
Anti-racism in Germany
Anti-racist organizations in Europe
Initiatives
Opposition to antisemitism in Austria
Opposition to antisemitism in Germany